Kevin Lloyd (1949–1998) British television actor.
 Kevin Lloyd (footballer, born 1958), English footballer
 Kevin Lloyd (footballer, born 1970), Welsh footballer